Cypress Grove may refer to:

 Cypress Grove (musician)
 Cypress Grove, California (disambiguation)
 Cypress Grove Chevre, cheese company
 Cypress Grove Plantation, a Southern plantation owned by President Zachary Taylor near Rodney, Mississippi.
 Cypress Grove (album by Glaive)